Promecognathinae is a subfamily of beetles in the family Carabidae. It contains 10 species in 7 genera:

 Tribe Dalyatini Mateu, 2002
 Genus Dalyat Mateu, 2002
 Dalyat mirabilis Mateu, 2002
  Tribe †Palaeoaxinidiini McKay, 1991
  Genus †Palaeoaxinidium McKay, 1991
 †Palaeoaxinidium orapense McKay, 1991
  Tribe Promecognathini LeConte, 1853
  Genus Axinidium Sturm, 1843
 Axinidium africanum Sturm, 1843
 Axinidium angulatum Basilewsky, 1963
 Genus Holaxinidium Basilewsky, 1963
 Holaxinidium fitsimonsi Basilewsky, 1963
 Genus Metaxinidium Basilewsky, 1963
 Metaxinidium leleupi Basilewsky, 1963
 Metaxinidium nanum Basilewsky, 1963
 Genus Paraxinidium Basilewsky, 1963 
 Paraxinidium andreaei Basilewsky, 1963
  Genus Promecognathus Chaudoir, 1846
 Promecognathus crassus LeConte, 1868
 Promecognathus laevissimus Dejean, 1829

References

Carabidae subfamilies